Penshurst Mosque is a mosque in the southern Sydney suburb of Penshurst, in the St George Area. 

The Penshurst Mosque was acquired in 1986 by the Bosnian community at 445-447 Forest Road, Penshurst. For nearly 30 years the Mosque has been serving the needs of the Bosnian Muslim community with a long history of co-existence and tolerance.

History
The earliest beginnings of Penshurst Mosque go back to the establishment of the Australian Bosnian Islamic Society Gazi Husrev-beg which was formed in the late 1970s by Bosnian immigrants.

See also
Islam in Australia
List of mosques in Oceania

 

Mosques in Sydney
Mosques completed in 1983
1983 establishments in Australia
Penshurst, New South Wales